Maxim Naumov  (born August 1, 2001) is an American figure skater. He is the 2020 U.S. junior national champion and finished within the top five at the 2020 World Junior Championships.

Personal life 
Maxim Naumov was born on August 1, 2001, in Hartford, Connecticut. His parents, Vadim Naumov and Evgenia Shishkova, are the 1994 World Champions in pairs for Russia. Naumov previously competed in gymnastics as a child. He graduated from high school in 2019 and will attend Suffolk University after taking a gap year.

Naumov's favorite skaters are Olympic champions Evgeni Plushenko and Yuzuru Hanyu, as well as his parents.

Career

Early years 
Naumov began skating at age five after being inspired by his parents. He is the 2013 U.S. national juvenile and the 2017 U.S. national novice champion, as well as the 2016 U.S. national novice and 2018 U.S. national junior bronze medalist. At the advanced novice level, Naumov is also the 2016 Gardena Trophy and 2017 International Challenge Cup champion.

Naumov made his junior international debut at the 2017 Philadelphia Summer International, winning the silver medal behind Ryan Dunk. He made his Junior Grand Prix debut at 2017 JGP Latvia, where he finished eighth. Naumov did not compete during the 2018–19 season due to injury.

2019–2020 season
Naumov returned to competition in June 2019 after missing the previous season due to injury. Competing on the 2019–20 ISU Junior Grand Prix, he placed seventh at 2019 JGP France.

Naumov won the junior title at the 2020 U.S. Championships. He landed two triple axels in his free skate and achieved a Level 4 on three elements. After attending the U.S. junior camp, he was named to the U.S. team for the 2020 World Junior Championships, alongside Ilia Malinin and Andrew Torgashev. At the 2020 World Junior Championships, he placed tenth in the short and fourth in the free to finish fifth overall.

2020–2021 season
Naumov started his season competing at the ISP Points Challenge, a virtual domestic competition for prize money, berths to the national championships, and future international assignments. Naumov competed in the senior men's event, placing sixth in both segments of the competition and seventh overall among ten skaters.

With the coronavirus pandemic raging, Naumov was assigned to make his senior Grand Prix debut at the 2020 Skate America, an event scheduled for skaters training in the United States and held in Las Vegas.  He placed eighth at the event.

Naumov next competed at the 2021 U.S. Championships, also held in Las Vegas, where he placed fifth in both segments and overall.

2021–2022 season
Naumov won the bronze medal at the Skating Club of Boston's Cranberry Cup event, and then came sixth at the 2021 U.S. Classic.

2022–2023 season
Naumov appeared twice on the Challenger circuit in the fall, finishing fifth at both the 2022 CS Budapest Trophy and the 2022 CS Warsaw Cup. Sixth after the short program at the 2023 U.S. Championships, he rose to fourth in the free skate and won the pewter medal. This in turn earned him an assignment to the 2023 Four Continents Championships. He finished tenth at Four Continents.

Programs

Competitive highlights 
GP: Grand Prix; CS: Challenger Series; JGP: Junior Grand Prix

2014–2015 to present

2011–2012 to 2014–2015

Detailed results

Senior level 
Small medals for short and free programs awarded only at ISU Championships. Pewter medals (fourth place) are awarded only at U.S. domestic events. Current ISU world bests highlighted in bold and italic. Personal bests highlighted in bold.

Junior level

References

External links 
 
 Maxim Naumov at U.S. Figure Skating

2001 births
Living people
American male single skaters
American people of Russian descent
People from Hartford, Connecticut